Throw Momma from the Train is a 1987 American crime comedy film starring and directed by Danny DeVito in his theatrical directorial debut. The film co-stars Billy Crystal, Anne Ramsey, Rob Reiner, Branford Marsalis, Kim Greist, and Kate Mulgrew.

The title comes from Patti Page's 1956 hit song, "Mama from the Train (A Kiss, A Kiss)". The film was inspired by the 1951 Alfred Hitchcock thriller Strangers on a Train, which is also seen in the film.

The film received mixed reviews, but was a commercial success. Anne Ramsey was singled out for praise for her portrayal of the overbearing Mrs. Lift; she won a Saturn Award and was nominated for a Golden Globe Award and the Academy Award for Best Supporting Actress.

Plot

Novelist Larry Donner struggles with writer's block due to his resentment towards his ex-wife Margaret, who took all the credit for his manuscript and received acclaim for it, while Larry, struggling to make ends meet, takes a job teaching creative writing at a community college. Owen Lift is a timid, middle-aged man who still lives with his overbearing, harsh and paranoid mother. Owen fantasizes about killing his mother but can't summon the courage to bring his desires to fruition. 

As a student in Larry's class, Owen is given advice by Larry to view an Alfred Hitchcock film to gain some insight into plot development for his murder stories. He sees Strangers on a Train, in which two strangers conspire to commit a murder for each other, figuring their lack of connection to the victim will, in theory, establish a perfect alibi. Having overheard Larry's public rant that he wished his ex-wife dead, Owen forms a plan to kill Margaret, believing that Larry will, in return, kill his mother.

Owen tracks Margaret down to Hawaii and eventually follows her onto a cruise ship she is taking to her book signing, where he plans to push her overboard. He returns from Hawaii to tell Larry of Margaret's death and that he now "owes" him the murder of his mother, lest he inform the police that Larry was the killer. 

After having spent the night drinking alone on a beach during the hours of Margaret's disappearance, Larry panics because he lacks a sufficient alibi. That, along with a news report announcing that the police suspect foul play, convinces Larry that he's the prime suspect. 

Larry goes to stay with Owen and his mother in an attempt to hide from the police. He meets Mrs. Lift, but despite her harsh treatment of him he refuses to kill her. Eventually, when she drives Owen to the breaking point, Larry finally relents and agrees to go through with the murder.

After two unsuccessful attempts, Larry flees the Lift home when Mrs. Lift recognizes him as a suspect from a news broadcast about his ex-wife's disappearance. He boards a train to Mexico and, surprisingly, Owen and Mrs. Lift come along so as to avoid having to lie for him. During the journey, Larry's patience with Mrs. Lift finally runs out when she impolitely gives him advice on writing. 

Larry follows her to the caboose with the intent of killing her, but Owen begins having second thoughts about having her killed and gives chase. In the ensuing struggle, Mrs. Lift hangs from the train, but is rescued by Owen and a repentant Larry. She is grateful to her son for saving her, but unappreciative of Larry's help and kicks him, resulting in him losing his balance and falling off the train to the tracks below.

During his recovery in the hospital, Larry discovers that Margaret is still alive; she had fallen overboard accidentally and was rescued by a Polynesian fisherman whom she has decided to marry. Much to his annoyance, Larry learns that Margaret plans to sell the rights of her ordeal for $1.5 million. On the advice of a fellow patient, Larry chooses to free himself of his obsession with his ex-wife and instead focus on his own life, and write about what recently happened to him, thereby freeing him of his writer's block.

A year later, Larry has finished a novel based on his experiences with Owen and Mrs. Lift, and titled Throw Momma from the Train. Owen visits and informs to him that his mother has died (albeit naturally) and that he's going to New York City for the release of his own book. Unfortunately for Larry, Owen reveals that his book is also about their experiences together. 

Thinking that his book has been scooped once again, an enraged Larry proceeds to strangle him, but stops when Owen shows him that his book is a children's pop-up book called Momma, and Owen, and Owen's Friend, Larry with the story drastically altered to be suitable for children. 

A few months later, Larry, Owen, and Larry's girlfriend Beth (Kim Greist) vacation together in Hawaii, and reflecting on the final line of Larry's book. Larry and Owen's books have now become best sellers, making them both successful writers, as well as close friends.

Cast
 Danny DeVito as Owen Lift
 Billy Crystal as Larry Donner 
 Anne Ramsey as Mrs. "Momma" Lift
 Kim Greist as Beth Ryan
 Kate Mulgrew as Margaret Donner
 Branford Marsalis as Lester
 Rob Reiner as Joel, Larry's Agent
 Bruce Kirby as Detective DeBenedetto
 Joey Depinto as Sergeant
 Annie Ross as Mrs. Hazeltine
 Raye Birk as Pinsky
 Olivia Brown as Ms. Gladstone
Farley Granger and Robert Walker appear via archive footage from Strangers on a Train as Guy Haines and Bruno Anthony, respectively. Oprah Winfrey also appears as herself in a fictional episode of The Oprah Winfrey Show.

Production 
In June 1987, Warner Bros. and Orion Pictures made a trade-off agreement to facilitate the filming of the movie, as well as the development of Arthur 2: On the Rocks, which was supplied for Warner Bros., and the deal was provided by producer Larry Brezner, who produced the movie as well as the original Arthur, and in return to use permission from Strangers on a Train, a 1951 Warner Bros. film, Brezner's production company surrendered the remake and sequel rights of the 1981 film Arthur to Warner Bros., which the original Arthur rights were jointly owned by Rollins, Joffe, Morra and Brezner and Warner Bros., and the Warners could not have proceeded with the Arthur sequel without the consent of Brezner's company.

Reception
On Rotten Tomatoes, the film has an approval score of 64% based on 36 reviews. The site's critical consensus reads, "Danny DeVito's direction is too broad to offer the kind of nastiness that would have made Throw Momma from the Train truly special, but DeVito's on-screen chemistry with co-star Billy Crystal makes this a smoothly entertaining comedy." On Metacritic, the film has a score of 56 based on 14 reviews, indicating "mixed or average reviews". Audiences polled by Cinemascore gave the film a "C+" grade on a scale from A+ to F.

Roger Ebert gave the film 2 stars out of 4, stating that "The plot in "Throw Mama from the Train" is top-heavy, but the movie doesn't make as much as it could from its weird characters."

Awards and nominations

References

Further reading

External links

1987 films
1987 directorial debut films
1987 independent films
1980s American films
1980s buddy comedy films
1980s crime comedy films
1980s English-language films
American buddy comedy films
American crime comedy films
American independent films
Films about dysfunctional families
Films about educators
Films about murder
Films about writers
Films directed by Danny DeVito
Films set in Hawaii
Films set in Los Angeles
Films set on trains
Films scored by David Newman
Films about mother–son relationships
Orion Pictures films
Rail transport films